Antonio Satriano (born 30 October 2003) is an Italian professional footballer who plays as a centre-forward for Eerste Divisie club Heracles Almelo.

Club career

Early career and Roma 
Born in Locri, Satriano started playing football at the local grassroots school Audax Gioiosa, before moving to Crotone in 2014. In the spring of 2018, aged 15, he was scouted by Roma during a match between the clubs' respective under-16 teams, and subsequently joined the Giallorossi's youth sector a few months later.

Having come through Roma's youth ranks, the forward signed his first professional contract with the club in September 2020, before reaching the final of the under-19 national championship in May 2022.

Heracles Almelo 
On 5 January 2023, Satriano joined Dutch side Heracles Almelo on a permanent deal, signing a contract until June 2027. The transfer included an estimated fee of €400,000, with a 20% sell-on clause in favor of Roma on a future move.

The forward subsequently made his professional debut one week later, on 12 January, coming on as a substitute for Samuel Armenteros at the 72nd minute of a 0–1 KNVB Cup loss against Go Ahead Eagles. Three days later, he also made his league debut, coming on for Abdenego Nankishi in the final minutes of a 0–3 Eerste Divisie loss against PEC Zwolle. On 13 February, he made his first professional start in a 0–2 league win against MVV Maastricht.

International career 

Satriano has represented Italy at youth international level.

After taking part in training camps with the under-15 (in 2017) and under-17 national teams (in 2019), he then went on to play for the under-20 national team.

Style of play 
Satriano is a centre-forward, who has been regarded for his finishing, his physique and his technical skills. Despite being naturally right-footed, he can still use his left foot effectively.

Career statistics

Club

References

External links 

 
 

2003 births
Living people
People from Locri
Italian footballers
Footballers from Calabria
Association football forwards
Italy youth international footballers
Eerste Divisie players
F.C. Crotone players
A.S. Roma players
Heracles Almelo players
Italian expatriate footballers
Expatriate footballers in the Netherlands
Italian expatriate sportspeople in the Netherlands